Herbert Holba (7 May 1932 – 26 October 1994) was an Austrian film director and screenwriter. He directed five films between 1961 and 1971. His 1971 film The First Day was entered into the 21st Berlin International Film Festival.

Selected filmography
 The First Day (1971)

References

External links

1932 births
1994 deaths
Film people from Vienna